Tamaulipa is a genus of flowering plants in the tribe Eupatorieae within the family Asteraceae.

Species
The only known species is Tamaulipa azurea, is commonly known as blue boneset. The generic name refers to the State of Tamaulipas in northeastern Mexico, and to the Tamaulipan mezquital scrubland, which covers much of the state. The species also occurs in the extreme southern part of Texas (Hidalgo, Cameron, and Willacy Counties) in the United States.

It has medicinal value and can be used in beverages.

Classification 
Tamaulipa is in the tribe Eupatorieae of the family Asteraceae.  Its closest relatives in the tribe are unclear; both Conoclinium and Chromolaena have been proposed.

References 

Eupatorieae
Monotypic Asteraceae genera
Flora of Tamaulipas
Flora of Texas